Chaetostoma loborhynchos is a species of catfish in the family Loricariidae. It is native to South America, where it occurs in the Tambo River basin, which is part of the Ucayali River drainage in Peru. The species reaches 14.2 cm (5.6 inches) SL. It is the type species of the genus Chaetostoma.

References 

loborhynchos
Fish described in 1846
Catfish of South America
Fish of Peru